The Issyk is a river in Kazakhstan that crosses the Issyk Lake (not to be confused with the much greater Issyk Kul Lake in Kyrgyzstan) and the town of Esik. It is a tributary of the river Ili.

In its upper reaches the river flows down a very steep slope (10-15°) over the deposits of a moraine overgrown with some vegetation and forms a deep (as much as 70 m) canyon; then, in front of the terminal vegetation-free moraine of the Pal'gov glacier, its longitudinal profile flattens out abruptly_ Here the river forms numerous branches over an outwash plain. Below Lake Akkul' (its absolute elevation is 3,140 m), the longitudinal profile undergoes another sharp drop because a large mountainous obstruction damming the lake and, perhaps, because of moraines buried under the obstruction. 

In 1963, the overspill of Issyk Lake caused a large flood.

References

Rivers of Kazakhstan